The Heinkel He 50 was a German World War II-era dive bomber, originally designed for the Imperial Japanese Navy. Serving in Luftwaffe prewar dive-bombing units, the He 50 served until almost the end of World War II as a night harassment bomber.

Design and development
In 1931, the Japanese Navy placed an order with the Heinkel aircraft company for a two-seat dive bomber, capable of carrying 250 kg (550 lb) of bombs, stressed for catapult launches, and capable of using either wheeled or float undercarriages.

A prototype, the Heinkel He 50aW, was completed in the summer of 1931. It was a biplane of mixed construction. The aircraft had twin floats and was powered by a Junkers L5 inline engine. The engine was found to be underpowered. A second prototype, the He 50aL, was built, powered by a Siemens Jupiter VI radial engine, having a wheeled undercarriage. A second He 50aL was built and redesignated He 50b. Based on the He 50b, a third prototype designated Heinkel He 66 was completed for the Japanese Navy, and used as the basis of the Aichi D1A.

The He 50 was an equal-span biplane based on a rectangular-section fuselage with a primary structure of welded steel tube construction, faired out to an oval shape by wooden formers and stringers and covered with fabric except in the extreme nose, which was skinned in light alloy. The wings were of fabric-covered wooden construction with a marginal stagger and very slight sweep, carrying ailerons on all four panels.

Operational history
The He 50aL was redesignated He 50 V1 and demonstrated to the German Defence Ministry in 1932. This resulted in an order for three development aircraft, and a production batch of 60 He 50A-1 aircraft, which were built during the summer of 1933. The Republic of China placed an order for 12 He 50As, but modified with an engine cowling added and designated He 66b. These aircraft were commandeered by the Luftwaffe and redesignated He 50B. In 1935, the He 50 was delivered to the Luftwaffes first dive bomber unit, and later partially equipped nine other dive bombing units. The He 50, however, was steadily replaced by the Henschel Hs 123 and Junkers Ju 87, after which He 50s were transferred to dive bomber training units.

In spring 1943, following the success of the Soviet VVS's Night Witches units against the Wehrmacht Heers frontline encampments while flying their Polikarpov Po-2 biplanes on nocturnal harassment raids, surviving He 50s were rounded up from training schools and delivered to night ground attack units operating on the Eastern Front. The He 50 was used to conduct night harassment sorties on the Eastern Front until September 1944, when the units were disbanded.

According to an author Lennart Andersson, twelve He 66 were allegedly ordered by China in 1934, but not delivered, and an information, that twelve ex-Luftwaffe He 50Bs were sent to China in 1936 instead, is a fiction, without a trace in archives.

Variants
He 50aW
First prototype as a floatplane, powered by a 291 kW (390 hp) Junkers L5 inline engine, badly damaged in a forced landing.
He 50aL
Second prototype as a landplane, powered by a 365 kW (490 hp) Siemens Jupiter VI radial engine.
He 50b
Third prototype designated HE 66 for export to Japan, three more completed for German evaluation, powered by a 373 kW (600 hp) Bramo 322B radial.
He 50A
Dive bomber, reconnaissance version for the Luftwaffe, 60 aircraft built.
He 50L
Redesignated of the HE 50A, production model, Heinkel produced 25, Bayerische Flugzeugwerke produced 35, powered by a 373 kW (600 hp) Bramo 322B radial.
He 66aCh
12 exported to China,  powered by a 358 kW (480 hp) Siemens Jupiter VIIF radial.
He 66bCh
Powered by a Bramo 322B engine, 12 built for export to China, but impressed into Luftwaffe service as HE 50B, later delivered to Hong Kong and remained in storage from January 1936 until July 1937, transferred to Peking for limited service in the 2nd Sino-Japanese War.
Aichi D1A1
Some He 66 reconnaissance aircraft were built by Aichi in Japan.
Aichi D1A2
Improved version of the Aichi D1A1.

Operators
 
Imperial Japanese Navy - one prototype HE 50b
 12 HE 66aCh, 12 HE 66bCh
 60 HE 50A in Luftwaffe service

Spanish Air Force

Specifications (He 50A)

See also

Notes

Bibliography

Donald, D., ed. Warplanes of the Luftwaffe: Combat Aircraft of Hitler’s Luftwaffe, 1933–1945. London: Aerospace Publishing, 2001. .
Eden, Paul and Soph Moeng, eds. The Complete Encyclopedia of World Aircraft. London: Amber Books Ltd., 2002. .
 Gerdessen, Frederik. "Estonian Air Power 1918 – 1945". Air Enthusiast, No. 18, April – July 1982. pp. 61–76. .
Kay, A.L. and J.R. Smith. German Aircraft of World War II. Annapolis, Maryland: Naval Institute Press, 2002. .

External links

WRG - Luftwaffe Resource Group - Heinkel He 50

Heinkel He 050
World War II dive bombers
Biplanes
He 050
Single-engined tractor aircraft
Aircraft first flown in 1931